The Akebono scale is a musical scale commonly used in traditional Japanese music. Akebono and the Diatonic scale use the same intervals, but Akebono has no fixed tonic; as such, any Akebono note can be the tonic.

The 1891 Transactions of the Asiatic Society of Japan describes the scale:

References

Japanese traditional music
Pentatonic scales
Hemitonic scales